Esther's Follies is a modern-day vaudeville theatre located on 6th Street in downtown Austin, Texas. The group is named after actress Esther Williams. Acts incorporate magic, juggling, singing, dancing, and sketches on current events. The show is fast-paced, and most of the acts incorporate a comedic theme.

The show lasts about one and a half hours with a short intermission, and runs every evening from Thursday to Saturday. The original Esther's Follies building burned down in 1982; the group traveled to several different locations before establishing its current home on 6th Street. 2017 marked Esther's Follies' 40th anniversary of performances. The cast has changed significantly since its inception but still includes the founders, Michael Shelton and Shannon Sedwick, who continue to make appearances during the show. Austin counterculture figure Kerry Awn was a regular performer with Esther's Follies for 30 years until 2011.

See also
Music of Austin

References

External links
 Esther's Follies

1977 establishments in Texas
Culture of Austin, Texas
Buildings and structures in Austin, Texas
Theatres in Texas